Patient 17 is a British independent feature film directed by Tuyet Le.

Synopsis 
The film is a supernatural thriller about two medical interns, Sam and Gaby, who investigate a patient brought to hospital. When they search into her past, they discover disturbing events that put their lives in danger. At first rivals, they finally team up to uncover the secret of Patient 17.

Cast 

Hannah Waterman, Cornelius Macarthy, Jonathan Linsley, Saul Reichlin, Christopher Dunne, Matthew Chambers, David Andrews

Michael Budd was originally placed on standby for lead which eventually went to Cornelius Macarthy, Michael was then cast as a mystery man but did not feature in the final cut due to budget constraints.

Reception 

In 2012, Patient 17 won the London Independent Film Festival Award for Best Sci Fi/Horror Feature.

External links

 
 

British crime drama films
2012 crime drama films
2012 films
2010s English-language films
2010s British films